Curryville is an unincorporated community in Adams and Wells Counties, in the U.S. state of Indiana.

History
Curryville was platted in 1859. A post office was established at Curryville in 1879, and remained in operation until it was discontinued in 1907.

Geography

References

Unincorporated communities in Adams County, Indiana
Unincorporated communities in Wells County, Indiana
Unincorporated communities in Indiana